Logan Nicoll is an American politician serving as a member of the Vermont House of Representatives for the 34th district. Elected in November 2018, he assumed office on January 9, 2019.

Early life and education 
Nicoll was born and raised in Ludlow, Vermont. He graduated from Black River Expeditionary School and earned a Bachelor of Science degree in community development from the University of Vermont in 2010.

Career 
Since high school, Nicoll has worked as a house builder and painter. He is also an IT and maintenance technician at the Castle Hill Resort and Spa in Proctorsville, Vermont. Nicoll has served as a member of the Ludlow Selectboard since 2014 and the Ludlow Planning Commission since 2012. He was elected to the Vermont House of Representatives in November 2018 and assumed office on January 9, 2019.

During his first term in the Vermont House, Nicoll served as a member of the House Human Services Committee and House Canvassing Committee. In January 2022, he co-sponsored legislation, with Selene Colburn, that would decriminalize drug possession in Vermont. If passed, possession of illicit drugs would be punished with fines instead of jail time. The bill would also establish a Drug Use Standards Advisory Board.

Personal life 
Nicoll and his wife had their first child in December 2020.

References 

Living people
Democratic Party members of the Vermont House of Representatives
People from Ludlow (town), Vermont
University of Vermont alumni
Year of birth missing (living people)